The Windbreakers were an American power pop group from Jackson, Mississippi, led by singer-guitarists Tim Lee and Bobby Sutliff. The band released their first EP in 1982, and were best known for an acclaimed 1985 album, Terminal. After three more albums, Lee and Sutliff began solo careers. Tim Lee released All That Stuff in 1997 and, with his wife, Susan Bauer Lee, formed the duo Bark in 2014. Another solo album from Lee, Under the House, was released in 2003.

Discography
Meet the Windbreakers EP (Big Monkey) 1982
Any Monkey With a Typewriter EP (Big Monkey) 1983
Disciples of Agriculture (Fr. Closer) 1985
Terminal (Homestead) 1985
Run (DB) 1986
A Different Sort... (DB) 1987
At Home with Bobby and Tim (DB) 1989
Electric Landlady (DB) 1991
Time Machine (1982–2002)

References

American power pop groups
Rock music groups from Mississippi
1981 establishments in Mississippi
Musical groups established in 1981
Homestead Records artists